Novi Sad is one of the most important Serbian centers of higher education and research, with four universities, numerous professional, technical, and private colleges, and a couple of research institutes.

Primary schools

Public primary schools

The municipality of Novi Sad has 37 schools (34 regular and 3 special ones) operating as primary schools. As many as 22 schools are located on the territory of the City of Novi Sad. In addition to Novi Sad, primary schools in this municipality are also located in places like: Bukovac, Stepanovićevo, Futog, Budisava, Petrovaradin, Sremska Kamenica, Kovilj, Kisač, Veternik, Rumenka, Begeč, Šangaj and Kać.
 
City of Novi Sad:

Municipality of Novi Sad:

Private primary schools
There are 4 private primary schools in Novi Sad verified from the Ministry of Education.

Secondary schools
The municipality of Novi Sad has 16 public schools whose activity is secondary education, with 4 gymnasiums and 12 secondary vocational schools.

Gymnasiums

Public Secondary vocational schools

Mihajlo Pupin secondary school of electrical engineering, Novi Sad

Mihajlo Pupin (Serbian Cyrillic Михајло Пупин) is a secondary school located in the city of Novi Sad, the capital of the Serbian province of Vojvodina. Specifically, it is located at Futoška 17. It was established on May 16, 1963.

The school provides education for grades 9 through 12, currently holding over 2500 pupils. It is one of the 15 secondary schools in Novi Sad. The school was named after Mihajlo Pupin, a Serbian physicist and physical chemist. Over the years, it has attracted instructors from Angola, Nigeria, and Libya.

Pavle Savić technical secondary school, Novi Sad
Pavle Savić (Serbian Cyrillic Пaвлe Сaвић) is located at Šajkaška 34. The school provides education for grades 9 through 12. It is one of the secondary schools in Novi Sad. The school was named after Pavle Savić, a Serbian physicist and chemist.

Secondary school of mechanical engineering, Novi Sad
Secondary school of mechanical engineering, Novi Sad (Serbian: Средња машинска школа Нови Сад" or Srednja mašinska škola Novi Sad") is one of the biggest secondary school in Vojvodina, Serbia. It was founded in 1936. The school provides education for grades 9 through 12, currently holding around 1500 pupils. It is one of the secondary schools in Novi Sad.

Svetozar Miletić vocational secondary school, Novi Sad
Svetozar Miletić (Serbian Cyrillic Светозар Милетић) is  located at Narodnih heroja 7. The school was established on October 1882, and added Svetozar Miletić to its name in 1969. The school provides education for grades 9 through 12, currently holding around 2600 pupils. It is one of the secondary schools in Novi Sad. The school was named after Svetozar Miletić, an advocate, politician, mayor of Novi Sad, and political leader of Serbs in Vojvodina.

Private secondary vocational schools
The municipality of Novi Sad has 13 private schools whose activity is secondary education  verified from the Ministry of Education.

Higher educational institutions

Public higher schools of vocational studies

Currently there are 2 public higher schools of vocational studies in Novi Sad.

Public universities and faculties

The only public university in the city is the University of Novi Sad.  The largest educational institution in the city is University of Novi Sad with approximately 38,000 students and 2,700 staff members. It was established in 1960 in Novi Sad with a modern university campus. It is composed of several faculties, some of which have their main departments located in Zrenjanin,Sombor, or Subotica.

Private universities and faculties

Novi Sad has several private universities accredited by the Ministry of Education, Science and Technological Development. All faculties align their curricula with the principles of the Bologna Declaration.

Learning centers

There are several learning centers in Novi Sad that provide additional or supporting studies for primary, secondary, and higher educations.
Novi Sad Open University
Center for Culture
Center for Permanent Education
Azbukum
Schneider Electric DMS, Narodnog fronta 25, Novi Sad
Center for Young Talents foundation, Liberation Boulevard 133, Novi Sad

References

Citations

Sources

Ljilja Milivojević - Zdenka Ivković, Vodič - prikaz srednjih škola na teritoriji Novog Sada, Prometej, Novi Sad, 1994.

External links

Elementary school "Ivo Lola Ribar" in Novi Sad
Mihajlo Pupin vocational secondary school official website (Serbian)
Srednja mašinska škola, Novi Sad Secondary school of mechanical engineering, Novi Sad official website (Serbian)
Center for Young Talents foundation official website (Serbian)